Equestrian Showjumper is a 1986 video game published by Artworx.

Gameplay
Equestrian Showjumper is a game in which 12 different courses are available, and the player can design a new steeplechase course.

Reception
Rick Teverbaugh reviewed the game for Computer Gaming World, and stated that "[Compared to other Artworx sports titles] Equestrian is my favorite."

References

External links
Review in Commodore Magazine

1986 video games
Artworx games